Hugh Richard Louis Grosvenor, 7th Duke of Westminster (born 29 January 1991), styled as Earl Grosvenor until August 2016, is a British aristocrat, billionaire, businessman, and owner of Grosvenor Group. He became Duke of Westminster on 9 August 2016, on the death of his father Gerald, 6th Duke of Westminster.

As of 2021, the Duke and his family were placed 12th on the Sunday Times Rich List with an estimated net worth of £10 billion. He was the world's richest person aged under 30.

Early life 
Hugh Richard Louis Grosvenor is the third child and only son of Gerald Grosvenor, 6th Duke of Westminster, and his wife Natalia (née Phillips). He was baptised into the Church of England on 23 June 1991. 

Through his mother, he is descended from the Romanov imperial family of Russia and maternally descends from Nicholas I of Russia, the Russian writer Alexander Pushkin and his wife Natalia Nikolayevna Goncharova, as well as from Pushkin's great-grandfather—African freed slave turned Russian nobleman Abram Petrovich Hannibal. Hugh Richard Louis Grosvenor is also a descendant of the Hetman of Zaporizhian Host Petro Doroshenko through Natalia Nikolayevna Goncharova. She is the great-great-granddaughter of the famous Ukrainian Hetman.

His elder sisters are Lady Tamara Katherine Grosvenor (married Edward van Cutsem, son of Hugh van Cutsem) and Lady Edwina Louise Grosvenor (married TV historian Dan Snow). The latter is a prison reformer and philanthropist, who co-founded The Clink Restaurants. The youngest sister is Lady Viola Georgina Grosvenor.

The letters patent that created the dukedom provide that the title go to the eldest male heir. As a duke, he ranks highly in the order of precedence in England and Wales.

Education
All the siblings were educated at a local state primary school, followed by a small private day school, Mostyn House School, near the family home of Eaton Hall, Cheshire. He then attended Ellesmere College in Shropshire, from 2000 to 2009. 

From 2010 to 2013, he studied countryside management at Newcastle University, graduating with a Bachelor of Science degree with upper second-class honours.

Career 
After university, the then Earl Grosvenor, as he was at the time, worked in estate management at Wheatsheaf Investment from 2013 to 2014, and the Grosvenor Group from 2014 to 2015, before becoming Accounts Manager at Bio-bean, an energy company, in January 2016.

Upon his father's death, in August 2016, as well as the peerages, he inherited a wealth then estimated at £9 billion, with considerable trust funds for his sisters. This wealth is held in a trust, of which the 7th Duke of Westminster, as he became, is a beneficial owner but not the legal owner—an arrangement that received considerable press attention, owing to the inheritance tax exemption it confers.

Personal life 
Little is publicly known about the duke's personal life. However, in October 2013, he was named a godfather to Prince George.

In April 2020, the duke donated several million pounds in support of the British government response to the COVID-19 pandemic and the National Health Service (NHS).

Arms

References 

1991 births
Living people
People educated at Ellesmere College
Alumni of Newcastle University
Hugh Grosvenor, 7th Duke of Westminster
7
English people of German descent
English people of Russian descent
People from Cheshire
English landowners
English billionaires
English philanthropists
People named in the Paradise Papers